Aiv Puglielli is an Australian politician who is a member of the Victorian Legislative Council for the Victorian Greens, representing the North Eastern Metropolitan Region. He was elected in the 2022 Victorian state election on the 24th count.

References

Living people
Australian Greens members of the Parliament of Victoria
Members of the Victorian Legislative Council
Year of birth missing (living people)
LGBT legislators in Australia
Australian people of Italian descent